The unique homomorphic extension theorem is a result in mathematical logic which formalizes the intuition that the truth or falsity of a statement can be deduced from the truth values of its parts.

The lemma 
Let A be a non-empty set, X a subset of A, F a set of functions in A, and  the inductive closure of X under F.

Let be B any non-empty set and let G be the set of functions on B, such that there is a function  in G that maps with each function f of arity n in F the following function  in G (G cannot be a bijection).

From this lemma we can now build the concept of unique homomorphic extension.

The theorem 
If  is a free set generated by X and F, for each function  there is a single function  such that:

 

For each function f of arity n > 0, for each

Consequence 
To prove the theorem, two requirements must be met: to prove that the extension exists and is unique (assuring the lack of bijections).

Proof of the theorem 
For this, we define , and given  then shall have the following graph:

 

First we must be certain the graph actually has functionality, since  is a free set, from the lemma we have   when , so we only have to determine the functionality for the left side of the union.

Before moving further we must make use of a new lemma that determines the rules for partial functions, it may be written as:
  (3)Be  a sequence of partial functions  such that . Then,  is a partial function. 

Example of a particular case 
We can use the theorem of unique homomorphic extension for calculating numeric expressions over whole numbers. First, we must define the following:

  where 

Be 

Be  he inductive closure of  under  and be

Be 

Then  will be a function that calculates recursively the truth-value of a proposition, and in a way, will be an extension of the function that associates a truth-value to each atomic proposition, such that:

(1)

(2) (Negation)

 (AND Operator)

 (OR Operator)

 (IF-THEN Operator)

References 

 

Theorems in analysis